Football Queensland Darling Downs is a Football Queensland administrative zone encompassing the Darling Downs region and parts of South West Queensland. The zone administers major regional areas including Toowoomba, Dalby, Roma, Charleville, St George, Goondiwindi and Stanthorpe. The premier men's soccer competition is the Football Queensland Premier League 3 − Darling Downs and the premier women's soccer competition is the Football Queensland Women's Premier League 3 − Darling Downs. Football Queensland Darling Downs also has a numerous variety of lower divisions for both men and women, as well as academy and junior competitions to develop soccer and fitness within the region.

The administrative zone traces its history to the Toowoomba British Football Association formed early in the 20th century with games played as early as 1906. The earliest mention of a regional association zone was in 1912 when the secretary of the association sought permission to erect post and mark out a field within Albert Park. The region has since been represented by of a variety of administrative councils representing sections of the contemporary zone. In 2021 as part of Football Queensland Future of Football 2020+ reforms, the region's councils were collated and renamed Football Queensland Darling Downs.

History 
Until 2021, the contemporary administrative zone was made up of a variety of regional associations providing administration and government funding within the respective councils. These bodies included Football Toowoomba, Football Chinchilla, Football Stanthorpe, South Burnett Soccer Federation and antecedent bodies.

Football Toowoomba 
The first game of British Association football was played in 1906, and the first club was Newtown.  The same article suggests that by 1908 there were up to 5 teams in existence. During 1906, Newtown played a series of games under British Association rules at the Polo Grounds.  Opponents included Rangers Rugby Football Club (rugby union) and the Young Rangers (rugby union).  The game against Rangers Rugby Union team ended in a draw.

In 1906, the newly-formed Newtown club invited Brisbane club Milton to Toowoomba.  Milton "won somewhat easily" but in the return game in Brisbane Newtown won 4 - 2.

In 1907, the newly-formed City or Cities teams played Newtown at the Polo Grounds.

By 1909, there were 5 clubs and a 6-team competition – Newtown Hotspurs, Toowoomba City, Western Suburbs, Kleinton Rovers, Kleinton Rangers and Oakey.

An early reference to British Association Football is in March 1912, when Mr. Henry Smith, the Secretary of the Toowooomba British Football Association approached the Gowrie Shire Council seeking permission to erect posts and mark out a field within Albert Park.  The annual meeting of the Toowoomba British Football Association was also advertised in March 1912.

In June 1920, a Toowoomba representative side played the touring New South Wales side at the Athletic Grounds, Toowoomba.  The local side put in a "creditable performance" losing 2 - 0.

In August 1920, a game was played at the Athletic Grounds, Toowoomba between a Toowoomba representative side and sailors from HMS Renown. At the time, there were 4 teams in Toowoomba's competition – Diggers, Norths, Western Suburbs and Wanderers (from Cawdor).  Two Digger's players selected for this game played for Queensland. Percy Martin had represented Queensland before World War One, whilst Dugald French was a current Queensland squad member.

A preview of the 1924 season indicated that definitely 4 and up to 6 clubs would participate in senior football.  The confirmed clubs were Diggers, Caledonians, Rangers and Toowoomba Athletic, with Waratahs and Willowburn Asylum also contemplating senior football.  Toowoomba Athletic and Waratahs were junior clubs stepping up to senior level.  Toowoomba Athletic played junior football as Scouts and it's possible they had some connection to the scouting movement.  Junior football was in existence and 2 clubs mentioned were Starlights and Tech Old Boys.  In addition, 7 schools were playing football.

In June 1925, the touring English FA side defeated a Toowoomba representative side 6 − 0 at the Toowoomba showgrounds in front of a crowd of 4,000.  In July 1925, after the English FA tour soccer was introduced to Warwick.
  
By 1938 there were 9 teams – Willowburn, Gowrie-Little Plains, Gomoran, Oakey, Sugarloaf, Southern Cross, Greenwood, Kingsthorpe and Rovers.

In September 1938 the touring Indian national team defeated Queensland 5-2 at Athletic Oval (now Clive Berghofer Stadium/Toowoomba Sports Ground) in Toowoomba.

In July 1939, Palestine defeated a "weak" Queensland team 13-3 in Toowoomba.

Football in Toowoomba fell into remission during World War 2 and only re-commenced initially on a junior basis in 1949 with seniors recommencing in 1951.

Women's Football 
Toowoomba was at the vanguard for Women's football in Queensland.  In June 1921, and at about the same time that Women's football was commencing in Brisbane, clubs were also being formed in Toowoomba.  The first clubs were Toowoomba Rovers and Toowoomba Cities.

In July 1921, interest was growing in sending a Toowoomba ladies representative team to play in Brisbane, with the Toowoomba players training at the Showgrounds.

A number of female footballers from Toowoomba have played for the Matildas, including Lana Harch and Karla Reuter.

Winstanley Memorial Shield 
The Winstanley Memorial Shield is a senior Men's pre-season competition held in memory of Ian David (Dickie) Winstanley, a talented Toowoomba footballer who died in July 1961, aged 19, from injuries suffered in a car accident.  Winstanley played seniors at age 16, captained the Toowoomba Under 18 representative side and at age 18 captained the Toowoomba Under 21 representative side.  In 1960, Winstanley won Willowburn's best and fairest player award (the Stanley Prasser Memorial Trophy).

Winstanley Memorial Shield Winners 

 1962 - Wilowburn (1st)
 1963 - Willowburn (2nd)
 1964 - Tattersalls Rovers (1st)
 1965 - Willowburn (3rd)
 1966 - Willowburn (4th)
 1967 - Willowburn (5th)
 1968 - Willowburn (6th)
 1969 - Willowburn (7th)
 1970 - Queensland Agricultural College A (1st)
 1971 - Rockville Rovers (1st)
 1972 - Willowburn (8th)
 1973 - Rockville Rovers (2nd)
 1974 - Rockville Rovers (3rd)
 1975 - Rangers (1st)
 1976 - Rangers (2nd)
 1977 - Willowburn (9th)
 1978 - Wanderers (1st)
 1979 - Rangers (3rd)
 1980 - Wanderers (2nd)

 1981 - Wanderers (3rd)
 1982 - Wanderers (4th)
 1983 - Wanderers (5th)
 1984 - St Albans (1st)
 1985 - Wanderers (6th)
 1986 - DDIAE (1st)
 1987 - St Albans (2nd)
 1988 - Willowburn (10th)
 1989 - Wanderers (7th)
 1990 - Wanderers (8th)
 1991 - Rockville Rovers (4th)
 1992 - Willowburn (11th)
 1993 - Dalby (1st)
 1994 -
 1995 -
 1996 -
 1997 -
 1998 - 
 1999 -
 2000 - 

 2001 -
 2002 -
 2003 -
 2004 -
 2005 -
 2006 - South Toowoomba
 2007 - West Wanderers
 2008 -
 2009 - South Toowoomba
 2010 -
 2011 - Willowburn
 2012 - Willowburn
 2013 - South Toowoomba
 2014 - Willowburn
 2015 - Gatton
 2016 - West Wanderers & Willowburn (Joint winners)
 2017 - Willowburn
 2018 - Willowburn
 2019 - Rockville Rovers
 2020 - Gatton
 2021 - Rockville Rovers
 2022 - Gatton

Clubs and competitions 
The Premier competitions in the region are the NPL Queensland Men’s, NPL Queensland Women’s, FQPL 3 Darling Downs Men’s and FQPL 3 Darling Downs Women’s, all of which form part of the Central Conference in the Football Queensland pyramid.

Former Clubs 
 Balgowan

Senior Premiers & Grand Final Winners

Football Stanthorpe 
The Stanthorpe District Soccer Association (SDSA) was formed in 1926 with three clubs – Amiens, The Summit and Stanthorpe.

The touring Chinese national team was scheduled to play Stanthorpe in August 1927, on their way to Brisbane to play Brisbane and Queensland, however the game was abandoned when part of the Chinese team refused to continue the tour.

In August 1930, the New South Wales team defeated a Stanthorpe representative side 7–0 in Stanthorpe on their way to Brisbane to play Queensland.

The Ballandean club was formed and affiliated with the SDSA in 1935, winning the premiership and Bishop Cup in their first season.

In July 1951, a Stanthorpe representative side played a Toowoomba representative side at the Brisbane Cricket Ground as a curtain-raiser to the third test between Australia and England.  Toowoomba defeated Stanthorpe 3–1.

In 1952, Stanthorpe regained the Perkins Cup from Toowoomba.  The Perkins Cup was donated by Mr Perkins (of Toowoomba) for competition between Ipswich, Toowoomba, Warwick and Stanthorpe.  At this time the SDSA had 5 affiliated clubs - Amiens, The Summit, Glen Aplin, Ballandean and Stanthorpe.

In October 2021, Stanthorpe International celebrated the 60th anniversary of its formation in 1961 by Italian farm workers with a re-union dinner.

Current Clubs

Former Clubs 
 Allora
 Amiens
 Glen Aplin (re-named Souths mid-season 1971)
 Olympia
 Pozieres
 Severnlea
 Souths (until mid-season 1971 was known as Glen Aplin)
 The Summit
 Thulimbah
 Wallangarra
 Warwick

Senior Premiers & Grand Final Winners

Football South Burnett 
Murmurings around creating the South Burnett Soccer Federation (SBSA) were growing in July 1928 with three clubs in existence (Kingaroy, Murgon and Memerambi) and interest in forming clubs in other towns and localities (Wooroolin, Wondai, Brooklands and possibly Nanango).  In April 1930, the third annual meeting of the SBSA was held at the Home Creek Hotel, Tingoora.

This suggests the SBSA was formed in 1927 or 1928, then changed names to the Proston & District Soccer Association at the beginning of the 1935 season.

One of the earliest references to "soccer" is from July 1928, when 2 teams (a senior and junior team) from the Kingaroy Town Soccer Club visited Murgon for games.

By 1931, teams from eight towns were expected to affiliate for the season – Murgon, Byee, Proston, Hivesville, Stalworth, Memerambi, Haly Creek and Kingaroy.

In October 2021, the Nanango Soccer Club celebrated the 40th anniversary of their formation in 1980 at a COVID-postponed event at the Taras Hall in Nanango.

Former Clubs 
 Abbeywood
 Hivesville
 Proston
 Stalworth

Senior Premiers & Grand Final Winners

References

External links

Associations
 Football Chinchilla Website
 Football South Burnett Website
 Football Stanthorpe Website

Football Toowoomba Clubs
 Garden City Raiders Football Club Website
 Gatton Redbacks FC Website
 Highfields Football Club Website
 Laidley Soccer Club Website
 Rockville Rovers FC Official Website
 South Toowoomba Hawks Official Website
 USQ FC Official Website
 Willowburn FC Official Website
 West Wanderers FC Official Website

Football Stanthorpe Clubs
 Stanthorpe United Website

Football South Burnett Clubs
 Kingaroy Senior Soccer Club Website

Football Queensland
Soccer leagues in Queensland
Sports leagues established in 2021
2021 establishments in Australia
Darling Downs